Kaliszki may refer to the following places:
Kaliszki, Łódź Voivodeship (central Poland)
Kaliszki, Masovian Voivodeship (east-central Poland)
Kaliszki, Podlaskie Voivodeship (north-east Poland)
Kaliszki, Warmian-Masurian Voivodeship (north Poland)